The Copa del Rey de Balonmano (English: King's Cup of Handball) is an annual cup competition for Spanish handball teams. Organized by the Liga ASOBAL. It was originally known as the Copa del Generalísimo and was renamed Copa de SM El Rey in 1975. It was the first nationwide handball competition played in Spain, and was first played for in 1957.

Winners by year

Winners by titles

 2 titles: Selección de Balonmano de Madrid, Teka Cantabria, Bidasoa Irún, San Antonio and Valladolid.
 1 title: Arrahona, Selección de Balonmano de Guipúzcoa, Selección de Balonmano de Barcelona, Marcol, Alzira Avidesa and Ademar León.

External links

Spanish Beach Handball Community

 
Recurring sporting events established in 1957
1